The 1944 Allan Cup was the Canadian senior ice hockey championship for the 1943–44 season.

Final 
Best of 5
Quebec 6 Port Arthur 1
Quebec 15 Port Arthur 4
Quebec 9 Port Arthur 6

Quebec Aces beat Port Arthur Shipbuilders 3-0 on series.

External links
Allan Cup archives 
Allan Cup website

 
Allan Cup
Allan